The COVID-19 pandemic was confirmed to have reached Transnistria (internationally recognised as a part of Moldova) in March 2020.

Background 
On 12 January 2020, the World Health Organization (WHO) confirmed that a novel coronavirus was the cause of a respiratory illness in a cluster of people in Wuhan City, Hubei Province, China, which was reported to the WHO on 31 December 2019.

The case fatality ratio for COVID-19 has been much lower than SARS of 2003, but the transmission has been significantly greater, with a significant total death toll.

Timeline

March 2020
 13 March: The Government of Transnistria banned all public gatherings.
 17 March: The government announced the shutdown of all kindergartens, schools, colleges and universities until the 5 April. The entrance of foreign citizens (including Moldovan ones) to Transnistrian territory was also banned for a period of 19 days.
 21 March: The first two positive COVID-19 cases were announced in Transnistria.
 24 March: The government announced the suspension of public transport.
 25 March: According to the television channel TV PMR, the Government reported that there were seven people infected with the coronavirus, including two minors.
 30 March: By decree of the Ministry of Internal Affairs of Transnistria, during the state of emergency, all citizens must carry an identity document and a special permission to be outside of their homes.
 31 March: A 55-year-old woman from Tiraspol who had heart problems and diabetes is the first reported fatality of COVID-19 in Transnistria. At the time of her death, she was in an intensive care unit connected to a ventilator.

April 2020
 4 April: The Government of Transnistria introduced a ban on the export of food products.
 14 April: Wearing of face masks in public places becomes mandatory. People without masks were warned that they would be restricted from accessing shops, pharmacies, and food markets.
 21 April: President Vadim Krasnoselsky cancelled the Victory Day parade on Suvorov Square.

Vaccines
An agreement was made with Russia in December 2020 to receive 300,000 doses of the Sputnik V vaccine, but these had not been received as of late February. Moldova has stated it will provide 10% of all vaccines it obtains to Transnistria.

Statistics 
Total No. of cases:

Total number of cases by age (21 January 2021):

Total number of cases by sex (21 January 2021), in %

COVID-19 cases in Transnistria by location (until 19 May 2020):

Gallery

See also 
 COVID-19 pandemic in Gagauzia
 COVID-19 pandemic in Moldova
 COVID-19 pandemic in Ukraine
 COVID-19 pandemic in Romania
 COVID-19 pandemic in Russia

References

External links 
 Coronavirus: official data Ministry of Health of Transnistria
 Updates on coronavirus Ministry of Internal Affairs of Transnistria
 Updates on coronavirus novostipmr.com

Transnistria
Transnistria
Transnistria
Health in Transnistria
2020 in Transnistria
2021 in Transnistria